Mahmudur Rahman Belayet is a Jatiya Party (Ershad) politician and the former Member of Parliament of Noakhali-3.

Career
Belayet was elected to parliament from Noakhali-3 as a Jatiya Party candidate in 1986 and 1988. He is a former President of Noakhali District unit of Bangladesh Awami League.

References

Jatiya Party politicians
Living people
3rd Jatiya Sangsad members
Year of birth missing (living people)